Dorothy Sylvia Saunders (later Jackson; 22 January 1915 – 12 November 2013) was an English track and field athlete who competed in the 1938 British Empire Games.

Saunders was born in Brentford, Middlesex in January 1915. At the 1938 Empire Games she was a member of the English relay team which won the silver medal in the 220-110-220-110 yards event and the bronze medal in the 110-220-110 yards competition. In the 100 yards contest as well as in the 220 yards event she was eliminated in the semi-finals. She also competed in the 1938 European Championships in Athletics held in Vienna and finished fourth in the 100 metre contest and fifth in the 200 metre event.

In April 1942, she married Harold F. Jackson in Brentford. Saunders died in Devon in November 2013 at the age of 98.

References

External links
 Profile at TOPS in athletics
 Profile at trackfield.brinkster.net
 British national athletics records as of 1950 (Internet Archive)

1915 births
2013 deaths
Athletes (track and field) at the 1938 British Empire Games
Commonwealth Games bronze medallists for England
Commonwealth Games medallists in athletics
Commonwealth Games silver medallists for England
English female sprinters
Medallists at the 1938 British Empire Games